Mikey Wood (born 18 April 1996) is a professional rugby league footballer who plays as a  for the Sheffield Eagles in the Betfred Championship. 

He previously played for the Huddersfield Giants in the Super League. Wood has played on-loan for Halifax and Oldham. In October 2017 he joined the Bradford Bulls on a season-long loan from Huddersfield. Wood joined Sheffield Eagles on a two-yeal deal in October 2021.

References

External links
Huddersfield Giants profile
Bradford Bulls profile
SL profile

1996 births
Living people
Bradford Bulls players
English rugby league players
Halifax R.L.F.C. players
Huddersfield Giants players
Hunslet R.L.F.C. players
Newcastle Thunder players
Oldham R.L.F.C. players
Rugby league players from Huddersfield
Rugby league second-rows
Sheffield Eagles players